Acrocercops delicata is a moth of the family Gracillariidae. It is known from Java, Indonesia.

The larvae feed on Nephelium lappaceum. They mine the leaves of their host plant.

Original description
Wingspan 7 mm. Head and thorax white. Palpi white, with fuscous marks at apex of second joint, and middle of terminal joint. Abdomen white, apex dark fuscous except extreme tip. Forewings narrow, moderately pointed; whitish-ochreous finely speckled with fuscous; six nearly direct white fasciae edged with minute dark fuscous specks, first narrow, almost basal, second narrow, third moderate, beyond middle, last three towards apex, slender, irregular, partly confluent or connected: cilia whitish, suffused with grey round apex. Hindwings and cilia white. Java, bred from Nephelium lappaceum (Sapindaceae); three specimens

References

delicata
Moths of Asia
Moths described in 1921